Sir Richard Baker (c. 1568 – 18 February 1645) was a politician, historian and religious writer.  He was the English author of the Chronicle of the Kings of England and other works.

Family
Richard Baker, born about 1568 at Sissinghurst, Kent, was the elder son of John Baker and Katherine Scott, the daughter of Sir Reginald Scott (d. 16 December 1554) of Scot's Hall near Ashford, Kent, and Emeline Kempe, the daughter of Sir William Kempe of Olantigh, by Eleanor, daughter of Sir Robert Browne. Richard Baker's father, John Baker, was the second son of Sir John Baker, the first Chancellor of the Exchequer.

Richard Baker had a younger brother named Thomas, who is doubtless the ancestor of William Baker of Lismacue House in County Tipperary, Ireland.

Life 
Richard Baker entered Hart Hall, Oxford, as a commoner in 1584. He left the university without taking a degree, studied law in London and afterwards travelled in Europe. In 1593 he was chosen member of parliament for Arundel, in 1594 his university conferred upon him the degree of M.A., and in 1597 he was elected to parliament as the representative of East Grinstead. In 1603 he was knighted by King James I, in 1620 he acted as high sheriff at Oxfordshire where he owned some property, and soon afterwards he married Margaret, daughter of Sir George Mainwaring, of Ightfield, Shropshire. By making himself responsible for some debts of his wife’s family, he was reduced to great poverty, which led to the seizure of his Oxfordshire property in 1625. Quite penniless, he took refuge in the Fleet prison in 1635, and was still in confinement when he died on the 18th of February 1644 (1645). He was buried in the church of St Bride, Fleet Street, London.

Marriage and issue
About in 1600 Baker married Margaret Mainwaring (d.1654), daughter of Sir George Mainwaring of Ightfield, Shropshire, by whom he had three sons and four daughters:
Sir Thomas Baker, born in 1602, who married on 9 April at St Mary in the parish of Lambeth, Frances Wilford, daughter of Sir Thomas Wilford of Ileden, Kent, and Elizabeth Sandys. They had eight children:
Mainwaring, born in 1603.
Arthur (died in 1644), barrister at law.
Anne, born in 1607.
Margaret.
Cecily.
Frances, married on 18 October 1645 at St Anne and St Agnes, London, Robert Smith, citizen and tailor of London. Smith is said to have burned a manuscript of Baker's life.

Works 
During his imprisonment Baker spent his time mainly in writing. His chief work is the Chronicle of the Kings of England from the Time of the Romans’ Government unto the Death of King James (1643, and many subsequent editions). It was translated into Dutch in 1649, and was continued down to 1658 by Edward Phillips, a nephew of John Milton. For many years the Chronicle was extremely popular, but owing to numerous inaccuracies its historical value is very slight. Baker also wrote Cato Variegatus or Catoes Morall Distichs, Translated and Paraphrased by Sir Richard Baker, Knight (London, 1636); Meditations on the Lord’s Prayer (1637); Translation of New Epistles by Mounsieur D’Balzac (1638); Apologie for Laymen’s Writing in Divinity, with a Short Meditation upon the Fall of Lucifer (1641); Motives for Prayer upon the seaven dayes of ye weeke (1642); a translation of Virgilio Malvezzi’s Discourses upon Cornelius Tacitus (1642), and Theatrum Redivivum, or The Theatre Vindicated, a reply to the Histrio-Mastix of William Prynne (1642). He also wrote Meditations upon several of the psalms of David, which have been collected and edited by A. B. Grosart (London, 1882).

Notes

External links
A Chronicle of the Kings of England from the Time of the Romans Government unto the Death of King James(1670) at Internet Archive

  

 
 which in turn cites:
James Granger, Biographical History of England to the Revolution (London, 1804)
Biographia Britannica, corrected by A Kippis (London, 1778–1793)
 

1560s births
1645 deaths
16th-century English historians
People from Sissinghurst
Alumni of Hart Hall, Oxford
17th-century English historians
16th-century male writers
17th-century male writers
17th-century Anglicans
Inmates of Fleet Prison
English knights
High Sheriffs of Oxfordshire
English MPs 1593
English MPs 1597–1598